As Five (English title: We Are Five) is a Brazilian comedy-drama streaming television series created by Cao Hamburger for Globoplay. It was produced by TV Globo's production division Estúdios Globo, as a spin-off of Malhação: Viva a Diferença, and premiered on the streaming service on 12 November 2020. Starring Ana Hikari, Gabriela Medvedovski, Daphne Bozaski, Manoela Aliperti and Heslaine Vieira, the series brings back characters from the original series.

On 16 July 2020, the series was renewed for a second season, which premiered on 8 February 2023. On 29 June 2021, a third season was confirmed. The seasons were produced together in 2022.

Synopsis 
After six years without seeing each other (and three years since their last group chat on social media), friends Benê, Keyla, Tina, Lica and Ellen are reunited in the Greater São Paulo and realize that the affection and admiration they feel for each other has never been lost, even after so long apart. At the height of being 25 year olds, they are all grappling with personal, professional and relationship conflicts. Together, they feel stronger to face the dilemmas of adult life common to Generation Z.

Cast and characters

Main 
  as Cristina "Tina" Yamada:Cool and sociable, Tina is a DJ of the biggest ballads in São Paulo with her boyfriend Anderson. Tina will have a tough job dealing with the loss of her mother without having time to settle disputes between them. As a first reaction, she will play at night and in all her attempts.
 Gabriela Medvedovski  as Keyla Maria Romano:Keyla raises her son Tonico alone and is always on edge with everything she needs to handle. She was forced to postpone her dreams to ensure her son's survival. From the reunion with her friends she will try to remake her wishes and invest in her career as a musical actress.
   as Benedita "Benê" Teixeira Ramos:Extremely methodical, Benê tries to remain calm, but she can't stand it when things get out of hand and get out of routine. She spent the last few years studying classical music. She lives with Guto, her boyfriend since school, until a twist separates them and she finds Nem.
  as Heloísa "Lica" Gutierrez:Explosive, ironic and somewhat boastful, Lica is full of ideas and desires, which often makes her look spoiled. Lica has already dropped out of three colleges, tried several personal projects, but didn't take any to the end. She is also completely lost in the love life since her relationship with Samantha ended.
  as Ellen Rodrigues:Because she is so career-focused, Ellen lives a little disconnected from the world of personal relationships. She was an excellent student in high school and her time at MIT in Boston was no different. She finished her degree and completed a master's degree in the United States. She dates Omar (Bilaal Avaz), an American, but her visit to Brazil leaves her uncertain about the directions she had planned for her life.

Recurring 
 Juan Paiva as Anderson Rodrigues
 Giovanna Grigio as Samantha Lambertini
 Thalles Cabral as Nem 
 Marcos Oli as Miguel / Michelle Esmeralda
 Matheus Campos as Lito
 Jessé Scarpellini as Samuel
 Tati Ang as Telma Yamada
 Bilaal Avaz as Omar
 Jesuton as Kiara
 Matheus Dias as Antonio "Tonico" Romano dos Santos
 Bruno Gadiol as José Augusto "Guto" Sampaio Neto
 Vinicius Wester as Michel Borovski "MB" Júnior
 Fernanda D'Umbra as Laura

Guest 
 Malu Galli as Marta Gutierrez
 Roberta Santiago as Helena "Nena" da Silva Rodrigues
 Ju Colombo as Maria das Dores Rodrigues
 Carlos Takeshi as Noboru Yamada
 Rafael Vitti as Ariel
 Sophia Abrahão as Dani Junqueira
 Dira Paes as Alice Guimarães 
 Yana Sardenberg as Silvinha
 Matheus Fagundes as Kléber 
 Guilherme Prates as Jonas

Series overview

Episodes

Season 1 (2020)

Production 

The first season of We Are Five was filmed between August and November 2019, in Rio de Janeiro and São Paulo, and containing 10 episodes. The show is renewed for the second and third seasons, both being produced together in 2022.

Awards and nominations

References

External links
 
 As Five at Globoplay
 

2020 Brazilian television series debuts
2020s Brazilian television series
2020s comedy-drama television series
Brazilian comedy television series
Brazilian drama television series
Coming-of-age television shows
Globoplay original programming
Portuguese-language television shows
Television shows set in São Paulo
Television shows filmed in São Paulo (state)
Television spin-offs